Hossein Ashtari is an Iranian military officer who served as Iran's Chief of police, the chief commander of Law Enforcement Command, from 2015 until early 2023.

Prior to the appointment, he was second-in-command of the forces replacing Ahmad-Reza Radan, having previously served as the commander of Intelligence and Security Police until 2014.

Ashtari is a former general of the Islamic Revolutionary Guard Corps.

Sanctions
Hossein Ashtari is among the 13 military and country officials who are responsible for suppressing the protesters of 2019–2020 Iranian protests. On May 20, 2020, the US Treasury Department put Hossein Ashtari on its sanctions list, along with Interior Minister Abdolreza Rahmani Fazli and several other senior officials of the security forces. According to the statement of the Treasury Department of the United States, Hossein Ashtari, as the commander of the police force of the Islamic Republic of Iran, was involved in the killing of "hundreds of protesters" in November 2018. 

On April 12, 2021, Hossein Ashtari was sanctioned by the European Union for serious human violations and suppressing the protests of 2019–2020 Iranian protests and was placed on the sanctions list of this union. According to the announcement of this union, his assets in Europe are blocked and he is prohibited from traveling to European countries and receiving visas from these countries. 

The UK government sanctioned Hossein Ashtari and 6 other officials of the Islamic Republic of Iran on Monday, October 10, 2022, for participating in the suppression of the 2022 protests due to the death of Mehsa Amini, as well as the November 1998 protests.

References

Living people
Chief commanders of Law Enforcement Force of Islamic Republic of Iran
Military personnel from Isfahan
Islamic Revolutionary Guard Corps personnel of the Iran–Iraq War
1959 births
Iranian individuals subject to the U.S. Department of the Treasury sanctions